William John McKeag,  (17 March 1928 – 23 August 2007) was a Manitoba politician and office-holder.  He served as the province's 17th Lieutenant Governor between 1970 and 1976.

McKeag was born in Winnipeg, and was educated at the University of Manitoba.  He served as general manager of Security Storage Limited (a family business) from 1952 until his appointment in 1970.  He also established the McKeag-Harris Reality and Development company in 1960.

In 1958, McKeag ran for the Manitoba legislature as a Liberal-Progressive candidate in the upscale Winnipeg riding of River Heights.  This was the year in which Dufferin Roblin's Progressive Conservatives ended forty-three years of Liberal and Progressive rule, and McKeag was defeated by Progressive Conservative candidate W.B. Scarth.

From 1966 to 1969, McKeag was a councilor in the town of Tuxedo, prior to its merger with Winnipeg.  He was also chairman of the Greater Winnipeg Election Committee from 1968 to 1970.

McKeag, at the age of 42, was the youngest lieutenant governor in Manitoba's history when he was appointed by Prime Minister Pierre Elliott Trudeau in 1970. However, the office of lieutenant governor is a ceremonial post, and he had almost no practical influence over the government of Edward Schreyer.

McKeag was appointed Honorary Colonel of The Fort Garry Horse on 26 June 1973 and held the appointment until 22 January 2000.

McKeag was appointed to the Order of Canada in 1996, and the Order of Manitoba in 2000.

McKeag died on 23 August 2007 at the age of 79. He was survived by his wife, Dawn, who is the daughter of former Premier Douglas Campbell as well as three daughters and one son.

External links
Official Biography from The Office of the Lieutenant Governor of Manitoba
Obituary from the Winnipeg Free Press
  Death notice in the Order of Canada newsletter.

1928 births
2007 deaths
Lieutenant Governors of Manitoba
Members of the Order of Canada
Members of the Order of Manitoba
People from Winnipeg